Ben Kouwenhoven (born 16 November 1965, in Sneek) is a sailor from the Netherlands, who represented his country at the 1992 Summer Olympics in Barcelona.  Kouwenhoven as helmsman in the Dutch Men's 470 with his twin brother Jan Kouwenhoven as crew took the 16th place. In 1996 Kouwenhoven returned to the Olympics in Savannah, Georgia. Again with his brother, Kouwenhoven took 24th place in the Men's 470.

Further reading

1992 Olympics (Barcelona)

1996 Olympics (Savannah)

References

Living people
1965 births
People from Sneek
Sportspeople from Friesland
Dutch male sailors (sport)
Sailors at the 1992 Summer Olympics – 470
Sailors at the 1996 Summer Olympics – 470
Olympic sailors of the Netherlands
470 class world champions
World champions in sailing for the Netherlands
49er class sailors